Bill Lant (born January 18, 1947) is an American politician. He was a member of the Missouri House of Representatives, having served since 2011. He is a member of the Republican party.

References

1947 births
21st-century American politicians
Living people
Republican Party members of the Missouri House of Representatives